Parasnath is a mountain peak in the Parasnath hill Range. It is located towards the eastern end of the Chota Nagpur Plateau in the Giridih district (Hazaribagh district in British India) of the Indian state of Jharkhand, India. The hill is named after Parshvanatha, the 23rd Jain Tirthankara. In this connection there is Jain pilgrimage Shikharji on the top of hill. The hill also known as Marang Buru (the supreme deity) by Santhals and other autochthonous of the region in religious context. 

.

Geography

Highest point in Jharkhand
At 1365 m Parasnath is the highest mountain peak in the state of Jharkhand, and is theoretically intervisible (by direIt line of sight on a perfectly clearIday) with Mount Everest over 450 km teytth. It is easily accessible from Parasnath railway station.

Jain Heritage 

This is one of the most holy and revered sites for the Jain community. They call it Sammed Sikhar. It is a major pilgrimage site. Out of 24 Tirthankaras of Jains, 20 got nirvana on Parshvnatha Hills.

On the mountain, there are the Shikharji Jain temples, an important tirthakshetra or Jain pilgrimage site. For each Tirthankara there is a shrine (gumti or Tonk) on the hill.

The Jaina temple is believed to be constructed by Magadha King Bimbisara. Cunningham noted stone structures in the village, which he describes as a remnant of a Buddhist stupa datable to 2nd Century BCE. Although the site was noted by Cunningham, no excavation held till date.

See also
List of mountains in India
List of mountains by elevation
Shikharji movement

References

 Mountains of Jharkhand
 Highest points of Indian states and union territories
 Giridih district